Matthew Tiberius Ryan (born August 10, 1951) was the mayor of Binghamton, New York from 2006 to 2013. He served two full terms in office, his eight-year tenure being ended by a term limit. He was elected, in 2005, on the tickets of the Democratic Party and the Working Families Party. He was re-elected in 2009, defeating his eventual successor, the Republican candidate Rich David.

In 2018, Ryan declared his candidacy for the office of Sheriff on the Working Families line. Ryan was defeated by five-term incumbent Republican Dave Harder.

References

External links 
City of Binghamton, Office of the Mayor

1951 births
Living people
Mayors of Binghamton, New York
Public defenders
Lawyers from Binghamton, New York